It was a Dacian fortified town, built in the 1st centuries B.C. and A.D.. It showcases a combination of religious and military architecture, stemming from the late European Iron Age and the classical world. It was eventually conquered by the Romans at the start of the 2nd century A.D..

References

Dacian fortresses in Iași County
Historic monuments in Iași County
History of Western Moldavia

https://whc.unesco.org/en/list/906/